Nilai Memorial Park is a public memorial park in Nilai, Negeri Sembilan, Malaysia. It is situated along the "Nilai Layby" of the North–South Expressway Southern Route and became the first closed tolled expressway public memorial park in Malaysia.

Notable burials
 Yeoh Tiong Lay (1929–2017) Chairman & Founder of YTL Corporation
 Puan Sri Rosaline Yeoh (1952–2006) – Model, Hong Kong television personality and wife of the YTL Corporation chairman Tan Sri Francis Yeoh 
 Low Boon Chian – Director & Founder of Petaling Garden Bhd, Chairman & Founder of Low Boon Chian & Sons. 
 Lee Hui Pin (1972–2014) – Malaysia Airlines stewardess who perished in the Malaysia Airlines MH17

External links
 
 Xiao En Group website

Cemeteries in Malaysia
Buildings and structures in Negeri Sembilan
Seremban District
Tourist attractions in Negeri Sembilan
Geography of Negeri Sembilan